Oscar Eduardo Cordon (born January 18, 1993) is a Canadian former professional soccer player.

Youth
Cordon began his youth career in the Driftwood Hispanic Soccer League with Toronto Future Stars. He later played youth rep soccer with the North York Hearts, Erin Mills Eagles, Brampton Youth SC, and the Mississauga Falcons. While playing rep soccer, Cordon also played for the   Ontario provincial U-14, 15, and 16 programs. In 2009, after playing in a match for the Ontario U16s against the Toronto FC Academy, he caught the eye of then TFC Academy Director Stuart Neely, and joined the TFC Academy.

Club career
In 2009, he joined TFC Academy and played for the team in the Canadian Soccer League. Cordon made two appearances with the Toronto FC first team during the 2010 season in non-MLS action, the first in June against Vancouver Whitecaps FC during the Nutrilite Canadian Championship and then in October against Arabe Unido during the CONCACAF Champions League group stage.

In late January 2011 it was announced that Cordon would travel with Toronto's first team to Turkey for preseason training camp, being one of four academy players invited to travel. After impressing during the preseason training camp he signed with Toronto FC on March 17, 2011.

Cordon made his MLS debut on April 13, 2011, in a 0–0 home draw against Los Angeles Galaxy as a second half sub for Gianluca Zavarise.

Cordon was released by Toronto on November 15, 2012.

In January, he went on trial with a club in Germany, but ultimately did not sign.

On July 18, 2013, Deportivo Iztapa announced they had signed Cordon. However, the two sides were unable to come to an agreement on a one-year contract, as they were awaiting his International Transfer Certificate, and Cordon returned to Toronto in September to complete his high school education. On September 1, 2003, he made his debut for Brampton United of the Canadian Soccer League against Astros Vasas FC. During his tenure with Brampton he helped the club secure a postseason berth by finishing fourth in the overall standings. He featured in the quarterfinals of the playoffs against SC Waterloo, but were eliminated by a score of 4-0.

Cordon joined the Woodbridge Strikers of the newly launched League1 Ontario in early 2014. Where he served as a player and a youth coach with the club. In 2015, he returned to the CSL to sign with the Serbian White Eagles. Midway through the season he was traded to arch-rivals Toronto Croatia and helped the club finish as runners-up during the regular season. In the postseason he featured in the CSL Championship finals match against Waterloo, and scored the lone goal to capture Toronto's tenth championship.

From 2016 to 2018, he returned to Woodbridge Strikers. In the winter of 2018-19, he played indoor soccer in the Mississauga-centered Arena Premier League with Croatia AC.

International career
Cordon is eligible for Canada as well as Guatemala and Honduras through his parents, although he has stated that his goal is to play for the Canadian national team.

Cordon was called up on five occasions by the Canadian under-18 and under-20 national teams for camps between 2010 and 2012, though he never made a competitive appearance for either.

In 2013, he was in talks to join the Guatemala U20 team. He obtained his Guatemalan passport, but did not join as he stated his objective was to join the Canadian team. In 2015, he attended a camp with the Guatemala U23 team.

Club statistics

Honours

Toronto FC
 Canadian Championship: 2010, 2011, 2012

Toronto Croatia
 CSL Championship: 2015

References

External links
 

1993 births
Living people
Canadian soccer players
Guatemalan footballers
Association football midfielders
Soccer players from Toronto
Toronto FC players
Brampton United players
Toronto Croatia players
Serbian White Eagles FC players
Canadian Soccer League (1998–present) players
Major League Soccer players
League1 Ontario players
Canada men's youth international soccer players
Canadian people of Guatemalan descent
Canadian sportspeople of North American descent
Sportspeople of Guatemalan descent
Homegrown Players (MLS)
Woodbridge Strikers players